Addington Forks is a rural farming community in the Canadian province of Nova Scotia, located  in Antigonish County. It was named for Henry Addington, a British prime minister.

People
 Iain mac Ailein, or John MacLean, a Scottish immigrant from Tiree highly important poet in both Scottish Gaelic literature and in the distinct Nova Scotia dialect of Canadian Gaelic, died at Addington Forks on January 26, 1848.

References

Communities in Antigonish County, Nova Scotia